The thirtieth or thirtieth customs was a tax on foreign trade in the Kingdom of Hungary.

Origin 

A charter that Andrew II of Hungary issued for the Benedictine Lébény Abbey in 1208 preserved the earliest reference to the thirtieth. According to the charter, wine and foodstuffs delivered for the monks and their guests were exempt from all tolls and the thirtieth at Győr and on the bridges of the rivers Rába and Rábca. Royal revenue from the thirtieth amounted at 1,500 marks when Andrew II granted it to his daughter, Yolanda in 1235.

According to a scholarly theory, the granting of customs and tolls to ecclesiastic institutions from the late 12th century gave rise to the collection of the thirtieth, because it represented the part of the revenues that the kings preserved for themselves or for their queens.

References

Sources 

 
 
 
 

Medieval Kingdom of Hungary
Taxation in Hungary